Morgan County is a county in northern Utah, United States. As of the 2010 census, the population was 9,469. Its county seat and largest city is Morgan.
Morgan County is part of the Ogden-Clearfield, UT Metropolitan Statistical Area as well as the Salt Lake City-Provo-Orem, UT Combined Statistical Area.

History
An early route of the Hastings Cutoff ran through the Morgan Valley and down through a narrow gorge in Weber Canyon. The Donner Party avoided going through the Morgan Valley in order to speed up their journey. However, their alternate route proved more time-consuming.

In 1855, Charles Sreeve Peterson and his family became the first white settlers to take up permanent residence in the Morgan Valley after cutting a road through Weber Canyon. After others began settling in the rather limited planar areas of the mountainous territory, the Utah Territory legislature acted on January 17, 1862, to form a separate county from sections partitioned off Davis, Great Salt Lake, Summit, and Weber counties. The small settlement at Morgan was named the county seat. The town (and thus the new county) was named for the father (Jedediah Morgan Grant) of Heber J. Grant, who would serve as president of LDS Church from 1918 until 1945.

Geography
The central core of Morgan County, the narrow East Canyon valley (now called Morgan Valley), is ringed by mountains. In its southern portion, Main Canyon Creek flows southward from Summit County to join East Canyon Creek, which flows northward from a different portion of Summit County. At their intersection, a dam has been installed to create East Canyon Reservoir and State Park. The combined discharge (now called East Canyon Creek) from the dam flows northwestward to Morgan, where it combines with Deep Creek to discharge into the Weber River, which also flows into the county from Summit and follows Lost Canyon to the Morgan Valley. The now-augmented Weber flows northwestward to Mountain Green, then turns west to exit the county through Weber Canyon. The terrain generally slopes to the north and west, with its highest point, Thurston Peak, at 9,706' (2958m) ASL. It is Utah's third-smallest county by land area and smallest by total area.

Major highways
  Interstate 84
 Utah State Highway U-65
 Utah State Highway U-66
 Utah State Highway U-158
 Utah State Highway U-167

Some county roads accessing the canyons are closed during winters.

Adjacent counties

 Weber County - north
 Summit County - east
 Salt Lake County - southwest
 Davis County - west
 Rich County - northeast

Protected areas

 Cache National Forest (part)
 East Canyon State Park
 Lost Creek State Park
 Round Valley Wildlife Management Area
 Wasatch National Forest (part)

Demographics

As of the 2000 United States Census, there were 7,129 people, 2,046 households, and 1,782 families in the county. The population density was 11.7/sqmi (4.52/km2). There were 2,158 housing units at an average density of 3.54/sqmi (1.37/km2). The racial makeup of the county was 98.11% White, 0.04% Black or African American, 0.18% Native American, 0.15% Asian, 0.45% from other races, and 1.07% from two or more races. 1.44% of the population were Hispanic or Latino of any race.

There were 2,046 households, out of which 49.70% had children under the age of 18 living with them, 79.60% were married couples living together, 5.60% had a female householder with no husband present, and 12.90% were non-families. 11.70% of all households were made up of individuals, and 5.80% had someone living alone who was 65 years of age or older. The average household size was 3.48 and the average family size was 3.81.

The county population contained 37.10% under the age of 18, 9.70% from 18 to 24, 24.30% from 25 to 44, 20.20% from 45 to 64, and 8.70% who were 65 years of age or older. The median age was 28 years. For every 100 females, there were 102.90 males. For every 100 females age 18 and over, there were 99.70 males.

The median income for a household in the county was $50,273, and the median income for a family was $53,365. Males had a median income of $42,350 versus $23,036 for females. The per capita income for the county was $17,684.  About 3.70% of families and 5.20% of the population were below the poverty line, including 5.70% of those under age 18 and 6.90% of those age 65 or over.

Politics and Government
Morgan County traditionally votes Republican. In only one national election since 1948 has the county selected the Democratic Party candidate (as of 2020).

Communities

Cities
 Morgan (county seat)

Census-designated places

 Enterprise
 Mountain Green

Unincorporated places

 Croydon
 Littleton
 Milton
 Peterson
 Porterville
 Richville
 Stoddard
 Taggarts
 Whites Crossing

Ghost towns
 Devils Slide

See also

 List of counties in Utah
 National Register of Historic Places listings in Morgan County, Utah

References

Further reading

External links

 
 UEN - Morgan County
 The Morgan County News - The Newspaper of Morgan County

 
1862 establishments in Utah Territory
Populated places established in 1862
Ogden–Clearfield metropolitan area